The 1907–08 Lancashire Cup was the third year for this regional rugby league competition and saw its third different winner. The cup was won by Oldham, who beat the previous year's winners, Broughton Rangers, at The Athletic Grounds, Rochdale by a score of 16–9. The attendance for the final was 14,000 and receipts £340.

The venue was the third different venue used in the three years which the competition had run.

Background 
For this season's competition, with the loss of Wigan Highfield, there were now only 12 semi-professional clubs, and with no junior team involved, this led to there being four clubs awarded byes in the first round

Competition and results

Round 1  
Involved  4 matches (with four byes) and 12 Clubs

Round 2 - Quarterfinals

Round 3 – semifinals

Final

Teams and scorers 

Scoring - Try = three (3) points - Goal = two (2) points - Drop goal = two (2) points

The road to success

See also 
1907–08 Northern Rugby Football Union season
Rugby league county cups

Notes 
1 * The Athletic Grounds was the home ground of Rochdale Hornets

References

RFL Lancashire Cup
Lancashire Cup